Ian Morris (born 27 February 1987) is an Irish football manager and former player.

Career
Dublin-born Morris came through the youth ranks at Leeds United. After being on the fringes of the first-team squad, he spent the majority of the 2005–06 season on loan at Blackpool, for whom he scored three goals in 30 appearances before returning to Leeds United, where he was a reserve team player, usually playing as a left-sided midfielder or striker.

Morris had two loan spells with Chesterfield during the 2009–10 season. In July 2010, he signed a year-long loan deal to return to the Spireites for the 2010–11 campaign. Morris played  21 games in the 2010–11 season which saw Chesterfield win the Football League Two title.

On 18 July 2011, Morris signed for Torquay United on a two-year deal. He made his debut for the club in the 2–2 draw with Burton Albion on the opening day of the 2011–12 season.

Morris signed for Northampton Town on 26 June 2013.

On 23 July 2015, Morris returned home to Dublin and signed for League of Ireland club St Patrick's Athletic. He made his debut the next day, in a 3–0 win away to Sligo Rovers. Morris scored the winning penalty in a 4–2 penalty shoot-out win against Dublin rivals Shamrock Rovers, to put Pats' into the 2015 League of Ireland Cup Final. On 5 March 2016, it was announced Morris had joined NIFL Premiership side Glenavon

However, in May 2016, Morris took a position with League of Ireland side Bohemians as their Youth Development Officer, and on 5 July signed as a player for the club, and was due to join the squad immediately. Morris made his first team debut for the club on 9 July in a mid-season friendly at home to Portsmouth.

Honours

Playing career
Chesterfield
Football League Two (1): 2010–11

St Patrick's Athletic
League of Ireland Cup (1): 2015

Bohemians
Leinster Senior Cup (1): 2015–16

Managerial career
Shelbourne
League of Ireland First Division (2): 2019, 2021

Statistics

Managerial statistics

References

External links

1987 births
Living people
Association footballers from Dublin (city)
Republic of Ireland association footballers
Association football midfielders
Leeds United F.C. players
Blackpool F.C. players
Scunthorpe United F.C. players
Carlisle United F.C. players
Chesterfield F.C. players
Torquay United F.C. players
Northampton Town F.C. players
St Patrick's Athletic F.C. players
Bohemian F.C. players
English Football League players
League of Ireland players
Republic of Ireland expatriate association footballers
Expatriate footballers in England
Irish expatriate sportspeople in England
League of Ireland managers
Shelbourne F.C. managers
Waterford F.C. managers